Hyalocylis is a genus of gastropods belonging to the family Hyalocylidae.

The genus has almost cosmopolitan distribution.

Species:

Hyalocylis marginata 
Hyalocylis striata

References

Gastropods